Charles Biddle (December 24, 1745 – April 4, 1821) was a Pennsylvania statesman and a member of the prominent Biddle family of Philadelphia, Pennsylvania.

Early life
Biddle was born to a wealthy old Quaker family on December 24, 1745, in Philadelphia in what was then the British Province of Pennsylvania.  He was the son of William Biddle, 3rd (1698–1756) and Mary (née Scull) Biddle (1709–1789). His siblings included: Lydia Biddle, who married William Macfunn; John ”Jacky” Biddle, who married Sophia Boone; Edward Biddle, a lawyer, soldier, delegate to the Continental Congress, who married Elizabeth Ross, sister of George Ross; Charles Biddle, and Nicholas Biddle, Revolutionary War Navy captain.

As a youth, Biddle was a schoolmate and close friend of Mathias Aspden and Founding Father Benjamin Rush.

Career
During the American Revolutionary War, Biddle was a captain in the merchant service and participated in the work around of the British fleet's blockade of American ports.  He volunteered in the Quaker Light Infantry and, in 1778, he served under his brother, Commodore Nicholas Biddle, aboard the USS Randolph.

Political career
Biddle served as Vice-President of Pennsylvania from October 10, 1785, until October 31, 1787 (also known as the Lieutenant Governor of Pennsylvania).  He served under John Dickinson and Benjamin Franklin and hosted George Washington.

During his term, he was an ex officio trustee of the University of the State of Pennsylvania (now the University of Pennsylvania). He was a member of the Pennsylvania Senate from 1810 to 1814. He also was an associate of Aaron Burr, having introduced Burr to his wife Theodosia shortly after the death of her first husband, Jacques Marcus Prevost.

Although Biddle vacated his seat at Council on October 13, 1787, the Commonwealth of Pennsylvania records that his Vice-Presidential term extended to October 31, the date of the next Presidential and Vice-Presidential elections. Biddle was elected Secretary of the Council on October 23.

Personal life

On November 24, 1778, he was married to Hannah Shepard (d. 1825), the daughter of merchant Jacob Shepard and Sara (née Lewis) Shepard, in Beaufort, North Carolina.  The Biddle family had a summer home outside of Philadelphia that was furnished sumptuously with English furniture and paintings. Together, they were the parents of ten children, including:

 Mary Biddle (d. 1854), who married John Gideon Biddle (1793–1826), the fourth son of Clement Biddle, in 1820.
 Nicholas Biddle (b. 1779), who died in infancy.
 William Shephard Biddle (1781–1835), who married Circe Deroneray. After her death, he married Elizabeth Bordeon Hopkinson, daughter of Joseph Hopkinson.
 James Biddle (1783–1848), a commodore with the U.S. Navy who died unmarried.
 Edward Biddle (1784–1800), a midshipman with the U.S. Navy who died at sea.
 Nicholas Biddle (1786–1844), president of the Second Bank of the United States who married Jane Craig.
 Charles Biddle Jr. (1787–1836), who married Anna H. Stokes in 1808.
 Ann Biddle (1788-1789)
 Thomas Biddle (1790–1831), a War of 1812 hero who died after a duel with a Missouri Congressman over a perceived insult to his brother Nicholas. He married M. Ann Mulllanphy.
 John Biddle (1792–1859), Michigan politician who married Eliza Falconer Bradish.
 Richard Biddle (1796–1847), a U.S. Representative who married Ann Anderson.
 Ann Biddle (1800-1863), who married Francis Hopkinson (1796-1870) in 1829.

Biddle died on April 4, 1821, in Philadelphia, Pennsylvania.  His widow died almost four years later on January 4, 1825.

See also
Biddle family

References

External links
Biography at the University of Pennsylvania
Fuller Collection of Aaron Burr (1756-1836), 1771-1851 (bulk 1778-1834): Finding Aid
Memoirs of Aaron Burr, Complete by Matthew L. Davis, Part 14 out of 17
 

Charles
1745 births
1821 deaths
Pennsylvania state senators
American people of English descent